Dealer Team Vauxhall, usually known as DTV, was a motorsport organisation.

in the absence of official sponsorship of motorsport by General Motors and Vauxhall Motors specifically, a group of London-based Vauxhall dealers decided to start an organisation to financially support racing and rallying. It was known as DTV and set up in January 1971.

The programs were principally run by Bill Blydenstein, an engine tuner and racing driver, and Chris Coburn for rallying. In 1976 Blydenstein became responsible for both racing and rallying, with the focus changing to rallying from 1978. 

Vauxhall Cars developed and used for racing and rallying include Viva, Firenza, Magnum, Victor, and Chevette.

Drivers included Gerry Marshall, Will Sparrow, Barrie 'Whizzo' Williams,  Jimmy McRae, Pentti Airikkala and others. Rally co-drivers included Rodney Spokes, Nigel Raeburn and Don Barrow.

The 1981 franchise merger of Vauxhall and Opel also brought Dealer Team Vauxhall DTV and the Opel Dealer Team (DOT), under one marketing umbrella, resulting in a new organisation, General Motors DealerSport.

External links
 The Vauxhall Viva Owner's Club (Owner's Club catering for all Viva models)
 DroopSnoot Group (Owners' Club catering for Vauxhall's 'droopsnoot' model cars, including the Firenza, Magnum and Chevette HS/R)
 GMCOG (General Motors Classic Owners Group)
 VBOA (Vauxhall, Bedford and Opel Association)
 Viva Outlaws (Owners Club catering for modified and racing Vivas, owners of the Viva GT Register)
 Viva Drivers Club (Owners Club catering for all Viva models, for owners who wish to drive their Vivas)
 VX4/90 Drivers Club (Owners Club catering for FD, FE and VX series Victors, Ventoras and VX4/90's)

Firenza